Graduate may refer to:

Education 
 The subject of a graduation, i.e. someone awarded an academic degree
 Alumnus, a former student who has either attended or graduated from an institution
 High school graduate, someone who has completed high school (in the U.S.)

Arts and entertainment
 Graduate (band), the band that Roland Orzabal and Curt Smith were in before forming Tears for Fears
 The Graduate, a 1967 American film
 Graduate (film), a 2011 Telugu-language film
 "Graduate" (song), by Third Eye Blind, 1997

Other uses
 Graduate (dinghy), a type of sailing vessel

See also

 Graduation (disambiguation)
 The Graduate (disambiguation)
 Graduate diploma, a postgraduate qualification
 Graduate school, a school that awards advanced degrees
 Postgraduate education, a phase of higher education
 Graduated cylinder, a container with graduated markings used for measuring liquids